The Eushta Tatars — are one of the three subgroups of Tom Tatar group of Siberian Tatars. Eushta mainly inhabit the lower reaches of the Tom river in Tomsk Oblast. Their historical and cultural centre is the Eushta village. Eushta are especially closely related to Chats.

History 
Eushta are considered to be originally Samoyedic Selkup inhabitants of western Siberia, who were greatly influenced by Turkic peoples and lately Turkicised. In the beginning there were migrations from Altai. Yenisei Kyrgyz and Tyolyos tribes formed a role in their ethnogenesis. In 9th and 10th centuries Kimeks arrived in the region, from which the Kipchaks derived, who also had impact on Eushta.

During the 15th and 16th centuries, the Eushta were under the rule of the Sibir Khanate. When Russians first came into contact with the Eushta, they numbered around 800 people.

Eushta Tatars adopted Islam at the middle of 19th century.

References 

Siberian Tatars
Tomsk Oblast
Indigenous peoples of North Asia